Thomas Vere Richard Nicoll (1770 – 22 October 1841) was an English amateur cricketer who made 12 known appearances in first-class cricket matches from 1790 to 1794. He was mainly associated with Marylebone Cricket Club of which he was an early member.

References

1770 births
1841 deaths
English cricketers
English cricketers of 1787 to 1825
Marylebone Cricket Club cricketers
Gentlemen of England cricketers
Middlesex cricketers
Old Westminsters cricketers